This is a listing of the horses that finished in either first, second, or third place and the number of starters in the Stephen Foster Handicap, an American Grade 1 race for age three and up at 1-1/8 miles on the dirt held at Churchill Downs in Louisville, Kentucky.

See also 

 Churchill Downs
 List of graded stakes at Churchill Downs

References 

Horse racing-related lists
Churchill Downs